Boyan Yordanov (born 12 March 1983) is a Bulgarian volleyball player, member of the Bulgaria men's national volleyball team. Boyan started his career in Levski (Siconco) Sofia. He made his first cap for Bulgaria in a match against France on the 2006 World Championship in Osaka. He entered as a sub in the third game with France leading 2:0. At the end, Bulgaria won 3:2. Bulgaria got to the bronze medals on the same WC. He has got a silver medal from the 2003 U-21 World Championship in Iran as well.

Sporting achievements

Club

National Championships

 2002/2003  Boulgarian Championship with Levski Sofia
 2003/2004  Boulgarian Championship with Levski Sofia
 2004/2005  Boulgarian Championship with Levski Sofia
 2005/2006  Boulgarian Championship with Levski Sofia
 2012/2013  Greek Championship with Olympiacos
 2013/2014  Greek Championship with Olympiacos

National Cups
 2001/2002  Boulgarian Cup, with Levski Sofia
 2002/2003  Boulgarian Cup, with Levski Sofia
 2004/2005  Boulgarian Cup, with Levski Sofia
 2005/2006  Boulgarian Cup, with Levski Sofia
 2012/2013  Greek Cup, with Olympiacos
 2013/2014  Greek Cup, with Olympiacos

National League Cups
 2012/2013  Greek League Cup, with Olympiacos
 2014/2015  Greek League Cup, with Olympiacos

Individually
 2012-13 Greek Championship MVP
 2013 Final four Greek Cup MVP
 2014 Final four Greek Cup MVP
 2013-14 Greek Championship Top scorer
 2016-17 Greek Championship Top scorer
2016-17 Greek Championship Best Opposite''

Awards

References

External links
 Boyan Yordanov at the International Volleyball Federation
 
 

1983 births
Living people
Bulgarian men's volleyball players
Volleyball players at the 2008 Summer Olympics
Olympic volleyball players of Bulgaria
Olympiacos S.C. players
Panathinaikos V.C. players
Expatriate volleyball players in Greece
Bulgarian expatriates in Greece